Dry Crane Creek is a stream in Christian and Stone counties in the Ozarks of southwest Missouri. Dry Crane Creek is a tributary of Crane Creek.

The stream was so named because it often runs dry.

See also
List of rivers of Missouri

References

Rivers of Christian County, Missouri
Rivers of Stone County, Missouri
Rivers of Missouri